Allégret is a surname. Notable people with the surname include: 

 Catherine Allégret (born 1946), French actress
 Élie Allégret (1865–1940), French Protestant pastor, father of Marc and Yves Allégret
 Émile Allegret (1907–1990), French soldier and member of the Resistance during World War II
 Marc Allégret (1900–1973), French screenwriter and film director
 Yves Allégret (1905–1987), French film director